Bernard Morin (3 March 1931 in Shanghai, China – 12 March 2018) was a French mathematician, specifically a topologist.

Early life and education
Morin lost his sight at the age of six due to glaucoma, but his blindness did not prevent him from having a successful career in mathematics. He received his Ph.D. in 1972 from the Centre National de la Recherche Scientifique.

Career
Morin was a member of the group that first exhibited an eversion of the sphere, i.e., a homotopy which starts with a sphere and ends with the same sphere but turned inside-out. He also discovered the Morin surface, which is a half-way model for the sphere eversion, and used it to prove a lower bound on the number of steps needed to turn a sphere inside out.

Morin discovered the first parametrization of Boy's surface (earlier used as a half-way model), in 1978. His graduate student François Apéry, in 1986, discovered another parametrization of Boy's surface, which conforms to the general method for parametrizing non-orientable surfaces.

Morin worked at the Institute for Advanced Study in Princeton, New Jersey. Most of his career, though, he spent at the University of Strasbourg.

Morin's surface.

See also
 Blind mathematicians: Leonhard Euler, Nicholas Saunderson, Lev Pontryagin, Louis Antoine, Zachary Battles

References

George K. Francis & Bernard Morin (1980) "Arnold Shapiro's Eversion of the Sphere", Mathematical Intelligencer 2(4):200–3.

External links
Photos of Morin with stereolithography models of sphere eversion.
The World of Blind Mathematicians, PDF file at the American Mathematical Society's website.

1931 births
2018 deaths
French mathematicians
French blind people
Blind academics
Institute for Advanced Study visiting scholars
Topologists
Academic staff of the University of Strasbourg
Scientists from Shanghai
Educators from Shanghai
Scientists with disabilities